Cauldwell (pronounced "Cordal") is a  small village and civil parish in South Derbyshire. Its streets are named Main Street, Church Lane and Sandy Lane. It has a school for children with special needs.

It is 4 miles south east of Burton on Trent and nearby settlements are Linton, Rosliston, Coton Park and Botany Bay.

See also
Listed buildings in Cauldwell, Derbyshire

References

External links

Villages in Derbyshire
Civil parishes in Derbyshire
South Derbyshire District